Kevala gyana or Keval gyan means omniscience in Jainism and is roughly translated as complete understanding or supreme wisdom.

Kevala jnana is believed to be an intrinsic quality of all souls. This quality is masked by karmic particles that surround the soul. Every soul has the potential to obtain omniscience by shedding off these karmic particles. Jain scriptures speak of twelve stages through which the soul achieves this goal. A soul who has attained kevala jnana is called a kevalin. According to the Jains, only kevalins can comprehend objects in all aspects and manifestations; others are only capable of partial knowledge.

The views of two sects of Jainism, Digambara and Śvētāmbara Jains differ on the subject of kevalins. According to Digambaras, a kevalin does not experience hunger or thirst, whereas according to Svetambaras, a kevalin has normal human needs and he travels and preaches too. Digambara Jains believe that they do not act in the normal sense of the word, that they sit motionless in padmasana, and that their bodies emit Divyadhvani, a sacred sound which is interpreted by their followers as the fundamental truth. According to both traditions, the last kevalin was a disciple of one of the eleven chief disciples of the last tirthankara, Mahāvīra; his name is recorded as Jambuswami. It is also believed that no one after Jambuswami will have the ability to obtain kevala jnana.

Literary sources
The claim of existence of omniscience by Jains, who deny the existence of a creator god, is a unique phenomenon. The Sutrakritanga text of the Svetambara school, elaborates the concept as all-knowing and provides details of his other qualities. Another text, the Kalpa Sūtra, gives details of Mahavira's omniscience

Immediately after the death of Mahavira, his disciple Indrabhuti Gautama became a kevalin. As per the tradition, the teachings of the tirthankara were memorized and preserved over many centuries.

In the second Upanga Agama, the Rājapraśnīya, there is a dialogue between Kesi, a disciple of Pārśva, and Payasi, a materialist king. In this dialogue, Kesi proves the existence of jiva and its ability to obtain kevala jñana to the king.

The Jains have a long debate with Hindus and Buddhists regarding omniscience. Bhikkhu Dharmakirti criticized the Jain notion of omniscience in his Pramanavartika. The Hindu philosopher Kumarila argued that only Veda had the authority to define human moral values since they were "beginningless, authorless and of self-sufficient validity". In response, the Jain monk Haribhadra (c. 8th century CE) wrote that humans already had knowledge of everything knowable. It only had to be illuminated or uncovered. Omniscience was, according to Haribhadra, inherent to living beings.

Samantabhadra was the first philosopher-monk in the history of Indian philosophy who tried to use inference as a method to establish the existence of omniscience In his famous work, Aptamimamsa, Samantabhadra asserts:

Akalanka (c. 720 760 CE) put forward the concept of suniscita-asambhavad-badhaka-pramana as a reason for the existence of omniscience. This concept is a well-known fact which is "we have no valid methods of knowing to deny the existence of omniscience". Hemacandra (c. 1088 1173) combined Samantabhadra and Akalanka's ideas of sarvajña in his Pramanamimasa to establish the existence of omniscience.

Jain epistemology

In Jain epistemology, there are two kinds of valid methods of knowledge: pratyakṣa or "direct knowledge" and parokṣa or "indirect knowledge". Kevala-jñana is considered pratyaksa. Five ways of obtaining knowledge are defined: matijñana acquired through sensory perception; srutajñana acquired through understanding of verbal and written sentences; avadhijñana, manhaparyaya jñana and kevala jñana.

Jains contrast all attempts to proclaim absolute truth with Anekantavada, which can be explained through the parable of the "blind men and an elephant". In this story, each blind man felt a different part of an elephant (trunk, leg, ear, etc.). All the men claimed to understand and explain the true appearance of the elephant, but could only partly succeed, due to their limited perspectives. This principle is more formally stated by observing that objects are infinite in their qualities and modes of existence, so they cannot be completely grasped in all aspects and manifestations by finite human perception. According to the Jains, only the Kevalis—omniscient beings—can comprehend objects in all aspects and manifestations; others are only capable of partial knowledge. Consequently, no single, specific, human view can claim to represent absolute truth.

Stages of spiritual development

According to Jain texts, there are fourteen stages (gunasthana) of spiritual development. The soul can gradually free itself, firstly from the worst, then from the less bad and finally from all kinds of karma, and manifests the innate qualities of knowledge, belief, and conduct in a more and more perfect form. The first four gunasthana are related to belief or rationality in perception. If and when the soul acquires rationality in perception, it moves on to the 4th gunasthana. Stages 5 to 14 relate to conduct. The purity in conduct determines the gunasthana from 5th stage onwards. Those who have taken the anuvratas {minor vows} may reach up to the 5th Gunasthana. The 6th to 14th Gunasthanas can only be attained by those who have taken the Mahavratas (major vows) of Jain ascetic. Following are the stages of spiritual development:

See also 
 Shrutakevalin
 Jain cosmology

Notes

References

Jain philosophical concepts